The 2009–10 NCAA Division I women's basketball season began in November 2009 and ended with the 2010 NCAA Women's Division I Basketball Tournament's championship game on April 6, 2010 at the Alamodome in San Antonio. The tournament opened with the first and second rounds on Thursday through Sunday, March 18–21, 2010. Regional games were played on Thursday through Sunday, March 28–31, 2010, with the Final Four played on Sunday and Tuesday, April 4 and 6, 2010.

The Connecticut Huskies successfully defended their national title from the previous season, defeating Stanford 53–47 in the final. This was the Huskies' second consecutive unbeaten championship season, unprecedented since the NCAA began to organize women's basketball in the 1981–82 season.

Season headlines
May 4:The tenth annual 2009 US Virgin Islands Paradise Jam is a women's basketball tournament that will take place on November 26–28, 2009. Eight teams from the NCAA have been invited to participate in the tournament. The teams will be separated into two brackets, the Reef Division and the Island Division. The Reef Division will consist of Mississippi State, Rutgers, Southern California and Texas. The Island Division will consist of Notre Dame, Oklahoma, San Diego State and South Carolina
May 5: The Atlantic Coast Conference and the Big Ten Conference announced the pairings for the annual Big Ten/ACC Challenge for women's basketball, which is in the third year of a four-year agreement.  The 2009 Challenge, which will take on a two-day format this year, will open on Wednesday, Dec. 2. The Big Ten/ACC Women's Basketball Challenge matches 11 teams from each conference in head-to-head competition traditionally on the first Wednesday, Thursday and Friday after Thanksgiving, following the men's basketball Big Ten/ACC Challenge. The Big Ten and ACC have been among the most successful conferences in women's basketball.  During the 2008–09 season, the ACC was represented by six teams in the NCAA Women's Basketball Championship. It was the seventh straight year the league has had at least six teams in the tournament. Maryland advanced to the 2009 NCAA Regional Finals, giving the ACC at least one team in the Elite Eight for the eighth consecutive year.  In 2005–06, the ACC became the first conference to send three teams: Duke, Maryland and North Carolina – to the same Final Four.  Overall, the ACC has made 11 Final Four trips, including six in the past 13 years.
May 28, 2009: NBA referee Violet Palmer was hired as coordinator of women's basketball officials for the West Coast Conference and will remain with the NBA, where she has worked for 12 seasons.
July 1: Rutgers will play in the eighth annual Jimmy V Women's Classic when the Scarlet Knights host Florida on Dec. 7. This marks the fourth straight season the Scarlet Knights will take part in the game. They beat Georgia 45-34 last season. The games are part of the fundraising effort for the V Foundation for Cancer Research, which is named for the late Jim Valvano, who led North Carolina State to the national championship in 1983.
July 7: Pat Summitt and C. Vivian Stringer will oppose each other in the fourth annual Maggie Dixon Classic. The women's doubleheader will be played Dec. 13 at Madison Square Garden. The two Hall of Fame coaches teams will meet in regular season play for the seventh straight year. Baylor and freshman star Brittney Griner will face Boston College in the other contest. The two teams played once before at Madison Square Garden. Tennessee won 68-54 in 1999. Baylor will be making its first appearance at MSG.
August 4: Joan Bonvicini was introduced as the new women's basketball coach at Seattle University. She is one of only 18 coaches in Division I history with more than 600 victories.
August 18: On January. 16, Notre Dame and Connecticut will be part of the first-ever ESPN women's basketball College GameDay broadcast. The game will be broadcast from Gampel Pavilion in Storrs, Conn. The matchup between the Fighting Irish and Huskies will tip off at 9 p.m. (ET) and will be televised live to a national cable audience by ESPN.
September 8: The West Coast Conference (WCC) and its multi-media rights partner, IMG College, announced Zappos.com as the official title sponsor of the WCC Men's and Women's Basketball Championships. The deal is effective through the 2011–12 season, and signifies the WCC's first-ever title sponsorship.

Major rule changes

Preseason

Preseason "Wade Watch" list
On July 30, the Women's Basketball Coaches Association (WBCA), on behalf of the Wade Coalition, announced the 2009–2010 preseason "Wade Watch" list for The State Farm Wade Trophy Division I Player of the Year. The nominees are made up of top NCAA Division I student-athletes who best embody the spirit of Lily Margaret Wade. This is based on the following criteria: game and season statistics, leadership, character, effect on their team and overall playing ability. The list are as follows:
Jayne Appel, Stanford
Jessica Breland, North Carolina
Tina Charles, Connecticut
Alysha Clark, Middle Tennessee
Allyssa DeHaan, Michigan State
 Alexis Gray-Lawson, California
Tiffany Hayes, Connecticut
Allison Hightower, LSU
Ashley Houts, Georgia
Jantel Lavender, Ohio State 
Danielle McCray, Kansas
Jacinta Monroe, Florida State
 Maya Moore, Connecticut
 Jené Morris, San Diego State
Deirdre Naughton, DePaul 
Kayla Pedersen, Stanford
Ta'Shia Phillips, Xavier
Jeanette Pohlen, Stanford
Samantha Prahalis, Ohio State 
Andrea Riley, Oklahoma State
Danielle Robinson, Oklahoma
Jenna Smith, Illinois
 Carolyn Swords, Boston College
Courtney Vandersloot, Gonzaga
Monica Wright, Virginia

Preseason Wooden Award nominees
August 21: The 2009–10 preseason candidates list for the Women's Wooden Award was released, naming 31 student athletes.

Preseason WNIT
Ohio State headlines a field of 16-teams for the 2009 Preseason Women's National Invitation Tournament. The field includes 11 teams that played in the postseason last spring: Arkansas-Little Rock, Bowling Green, Florida Gulf Coast, Georgia Tech, Marist, New Mexico, North Carolina A&T, Ohio State, Oklahoma State, West Virginia, and Winthrop. They will be joined in the Preseason WNIT field by Chicago State, Eastern Illinois, Northern Colorado, Towson, and UTEP.

The Preseason WNIT features a three-game guarantee format. The event opens Friday, November 13 with first-round games. Second-round games will be played November 15 and 16. The semifinals will be on November 18 and 19. The championship is set for Sunday, November 22.  Teams that lose in the first two rounds will play consolation games on the second weekend, November 20–22. All games are hosted by participating schools, and sites are announced by the end of the preceding round. In last year's Preseason WNIT, North Carolina defeated Oklahoma 80-79.

First-round Preseason WNIT games to be held on Friday, Nov. 13, 2009
Eastern Illinois (24-9) at Ohio State (29-6), 5 p.m. ET
UTEP (18-12) at Florida Gulf Coast (26-5), 7 p.m. ET
Arkansas-Little Rock (26-7) at Oklahoma State (17-16), 7 p.m. ET
Towson (17-13) at West Virginia (18-15), 7 p.m. ET
Winthrop (16-16) at Georgia Tech (22-10), 7:30 p.m. ET
Chicago State (16-13) at Bowling Green (29-5), 7:30 p.m. ET
North Carolina A&T (26-7) at Marist (29-4), 7:30 p.m. ET
Northern Colorado (12-18) at New Mexico (25-11), 9 p.m. ET

Season outlook
Nov. 11: The Big Ten and Big 12 Conferences announced the formation of an annual inter-conference challenge for women's basketball. The challenge will span at least two years and will begin in the fall of 2010. The series will feature a home-and-home format over the initial two-year agreement, and each of the Big 12's teams will play in each Challenge, while one Big Ten team, Wisconsin, will play two Challenge games each year.

Pre-season polls

Preseason All-Americans
Jayne Appel, Stanford
Tina Charles, Connecticut
Jantel Lavender, Ohio State
Maya Moore, Connecticut
Monica Wright, Virginia
November 3: Maya Moore became just the seventh unanimous choice on The Associated Press' preseason All-America team. She received all 40 votes from a national media panel. It's the third straight year a player has been a unanimous choice in the preseason. Moore was joined on the preseason squad by teammate Tina Charles. It was the fifth time that two players from the same team made the All-America squad. Connecticut has also had two of the four other pairs of teammates on a preseason team – Jen Rizzotti and Kara Wolters in 1995–96 and Shea Ralph and Svetlana Abrosimova in 2000–01.

Preseason All-Conference teams

Big Ten
2009–10 Big Ten Preseason Player of the Year
Jantel Lavender
Preseason All-Big Ten Coaches Team
Jenna Smith, Sr., F, ILL
Allyssa DeHaan, Sr., C, MSU
JANTEL LAVENDER, Jr., C, OSU
Samantha Prahalis, So., G, OSU
Tyra Grant, Sr., F, PSU
Preseason All-Big Ten Media Team
Jenna Smith, Sr., F, ILL
Allyssa DeHaan, Sr., C, MSU
JANTEL LAVENDER, Jr., C, OSU
Samantha Prahalis, So., G, OSU
Tyra Grant, Sr., F, PSU

Conference USA
2009–10 C-USA Preseason PLAYER OF THE YEAR
Emma Cannon, UCF
2009–10 C-USA Preseason Team
Courtney Taylor, Houston
Brittany Gilliam, SMU
Pauline Love, Southern Miss
Emma Cannon, UCF
Jareica Hughes, UTEP

Regular season

2009 Big Ten/ACC Challenge schedule

Early season tournaments

Conference winners and tournaments
Thirty athletic conferences each end their regular seasons with a single-elimination tournament. The teams in each conference that win their regular season title are given the number one seed in each tournament, with tiebreakers applied if more than one team tops the season standings. In the table below, if teams tied for the regular-season title, the first team listed won the tiebreaker for top seed in the tournament.

The winners of these tournaments receive automatic invitations to the 2010 NCAA Women's Division I Basketball Tournament. The Ivy League does not have a conference tournament, instead giving their automatic invitation to their regular-season champion.  The Great West Conference began play in 2009–10 and does not receive an automatic bid to the NCAA tournament.

Coaching changes

Final season rankings

Post-season tournaments

NCAA tournament

Final Four – Alamodome, San Antonio, Texas

National Invitation tournament

Women's Basketball Invitational

This season saw the debut of a third national postseason tournament in the Women's Basketball Invitational, a 16-team affair with all games played on home courts.

The inaugural title was won by Appalachian State, who came back from a 19-point deficit to defeat Memphis 79–71 in the final held on the Mountaineers' home floor in Boone, North Carolina.

Awards and honors

Consensus All-American teams

Major player of the year awards
Wooden Award: Tina Charles, Connecticut
Naismith Award: Tina Charles, Connecticut
Wade Trophy: Maya Moore, Connecticut

Major coach of the year awards
Kay Yow Award: Connie Yori, Nebraska
Maggie Dixon Award: Teresa Weatherspoon, Louisiana Tech
Naismith College Coach of the Year: Connie Yori, Nebraska
WBCA National Coach of the Year: Connie Yori, Nebraska

Other major awards
Nancy Lieberman Award (Best point guard): Andrea Riley, Oklahoma State
Frances Pomeroy Naismith Award (Best player 5'8"/1.73 m or shorter): Alexis Gray-Lawson, California
Lowe's Senior CLASS Award (top senior): Kelsey Griffin, Nebraska

Conference standings

See also
2009–10 NCAA Division I women's basketball rankings
2010 NCAA Women's Division I Basketball Tournament
2009–10 ACC women's basketball season
2009–10 Big Ten Conference women's basketball season
2009–10 NCAA Division I men's basketball season
2009–10 NCAA Division I women's ice hockey season

References

 
2009–10 in American women's college basketball